Tiago Godinho (born 13 August 1984) is a Portuguese former professional tennis player who competed in the ITF Men's Circuit. He achieved his highest singles ranking of 750 in the world by the Association of Tennis Professionals (ATP) in July 2003. Though he never entered a singles event in the ATP Challenger Tour, Godinho did play in the doubles event at the 2004 Estoril Open and was selected for one Davis Cup tie in 2002.

Career finals

ITF Men's Circuit

Doubles: 5 (2 titles, 3 runner-ups)

National participation

Davis Cup (0 wins, 1 loss)
Godinho played 1 match in 1 tie for the Portugal Davis Cup team in 2002. His singles record was 0–1 and his doubles record was 0–0 (0–1 overall).

   indicates the result of the Davis Cup match followed by the score, date, place of event, the zonal classification and its phase, and the court surface.

References

External links 
 
 
 

1984 births
Living people
Portuguese male tennis players
Sportspeople from Lisbon
21st-century Portuguese people